Görgeshausen is an Ortsgemeinde – a community belonging to a Verbandsgemeinde – in the Westerwaldkreis in Rhineland-Palatinate, Germany.

Geography

The community lies in the Westerwald between Koblenz and Gießen on the edge of the Nassau Nature Park, and borders on Hesse. The community belongs to the Verbandsgemeinde of Montabaur, a kind of collective municipality.

History
In 1290, Görgeshausen had its first documentary mention as Gerinzhausen.

Politics

Community council
The council is made up of 12 council members who were elected in a majority vote in a municipal election on 7 June 2009.

Coat of arms
The middle part of the community's arms symbolizes the so-called Löwenstein (“Lion’s Stone”), a border stone that once marked the boundary between Görgeshausen, which was then held by the Electorate of Trier, and the area belonging then to Nassau-Diez. The two linden twigs refer to the linden tree that formerly stood on the church hill in the middle of the village.

Sport
There is a sport club called Grün Weiß Görgeshausen. The name means “Green White”.

Economy and infrastructure

The nearest Autobahn interchange is Diez on the A 3 (Cologne–Frankfurt) about a kilometre away.

References

External links
Görgeshausen in the collective municipality’s Web pages 

Municipalities in Rhineland-Palatinate
Westerwaldkreis